Álvaro Pina (born 15 November 1906), former Portuguese footballer who played as defender.

International career 
Pina played 1 cap for Portugal, in a 0-1 defeat against Spain 30 November 1930 in Porto.

External links 
 
 

1906 births
Portugal international footballers
Portuguese footballers
Year of death missing
Association football defenders